The Peter McDonald Premiership is a New South Wales, Australia rugby league competition. The competition commenced in April 2022. The competition incorporates the former Group 10 and Group 11 competitions by implementing a first past the post system to award silverware to the clubs  who win the respective historic competitions. The top four from each conference will then compete in the Finals with the overall Western Conference winners progressing to the two week state NSWRL Presidents Cup finals against the Northern (Newcastle), Southern (Illawarra) and Ron Massey Cup (Sydney) conferences to crown the state semi-professional club champions. The competition only has First Grade and Under 18s, with respective reserves and women's tag competitions remaining under the control of Group 10 and Group 11. Blayney is the only Group 10 club not to field a side in the Peter McDonald Premiership competition; all Group 11 clubs compete.

The competition is named in honour of the late Peter 'Ace' McDonald, a long-time Cowra Magpies, Group 10, Western Division and Country Rugby League administrator.

Clubs
The first grade competition is played in Group 10 and 11 Pools with crossover games, whilst the under 18s is simply an open league with no divisions.

Group 10

Group 11

Grand Finals

Peter McDonald Premiership (First Grade)

Tom Nelson Under 18s Premiership

Premiers Challenges

Western Premiers Challenge - Reserve Grade

Western Premiers Challenge - League Tag

Fixtures List / Draw 
The website, Play Rugby League hosts the 2022 Peter McDonald Premiership draw and ladder.

References 

Rugby league competitions in New South Wales
Country New South Wales rugby league team